The 1945 Canadian federal election was held on June 11, 1945, to elect members of the House of Commons of the 20th Parliament of Canada. Prime Minister William Lyon Mackenzie King's Liberal government was re-elected to its third consecutive term, although this time with a minority government as the Liberals fell five seats short of a majority.

Since 1939, Canada had been fighting in World War II. In May 1945, the war in Europe ended, allowing King to call an election. As the war in Asia was still raging on, King promised a voluntary force to fight in Operation Downfall, the planned invasion of Japan, while Progressive Conservative Party (PC Party) leader John Bracken promised conscription, which was an unpopular proposal and led to the PCs' third consecutive defeat. The Liberals were also re-elected because of their promise to expand welfare programs. However, they lost about a third of their seats; the stark decline in support was partly attributed to their introduction of conscription in 1944, which was unpopular in many parts of Canada. In addition, the democratic socialist Co-operative Commonwealth Federation made a minor breakthrough while the Social Credit Party made slight gains.

Although the election officially resulted in a minority government, the election of eight "Independent Liberal" MPs, most of whom did not run as official Liberals because of their opposition to conscription, gave the King government an effective working majority in parliament. Most of the Independent Liberal MPs joined (or re-joined) the Liberal caucus following World War II when the conscription issue became moot. As King was defeated in his own riding of Prince Albert, fellow Liberal William MacDiarmid, who was re-elected in the safe seat of Glengarry, resigned so that a by-election could be held, which was subsequently won by King.

Background

In the 1935 election, the Liberal Party led by William Lyon Mackenzie King returned to power (King's Liberals had previously governed Canada from 1921 to 1930) with a landslide majority government. The King government's success in combatting the Great Depression led to their second landslide majority victory in the 1940 election. From 1939 to 1945, the King government's main priority was aiding the Allies in World War II.

In the period leading up to the election, the Co-operative Commonwealth Federation was rising in popularity. A Gallup poll from September 1943 showed the CCF with a one-point lead over both the Liberals and Progressive Conservatives. Many predicted a major breakthrough for the CCF nationally and the party was expected to win 70 to 100 seats, possibly even enough to form a minority government. In the Saskatchewan provincial election, the CCF won a landslide victory, forming a provincial government for the first time.

In 1942, members of the Conservative Party held the Port Hope Conference, which established several Conservative goals including support for free enterprise and conscription, and more radical policies such as full-employment, low-cost housing, trade union rights, as well as a whole range of social security measures, including a government financed medicare system. Progressive Party Premier of Manitoba John Bracken became the Conservative Party's leader that same year, and changed the party's name to the Progressive Conservative Party as a result of this policy shift.

Campaign

Liberals

A key issue in this election seems to have been electing a stable government. The Liberals urged voters to "Return the Mackenzie King Government", and argued that only the Liberal Party had a "preponderance of members in all nine provinces". Mackenzie King threatened to call a new election if he was not given a majority: "We would have confusion to deal with at a time when the world will be in a very disturbed situation. The war in Europe is over, but unrest in the east is not over."

Social welfare programs were also an issue in the campaign. Another Liberal slogan encouraged voters to "Build a New Social Order" by endorsing the Liberal platform, which included
 $750 million to provide land, jobs and business support for veterans;
 $400 million of public spending to build housing;
 $250 million for family allowances;
 establishing an Industrial development Bank;
 loans to farmers, floor prices for agricultural products;
 tax reductions.

Progressive Conservatives

The Progressive Conservatives tried to capitalize on the massive mid-campaign victory by the Ontario Progressive Conservative Party in the 1945 Ontario provincial election. PC campaign ads exhorted voters to rally behind their party: "Ontario shows! Only Bracken can win!", and suggesting that it would be impossible to form a majority government in the country without a plurality of seats in Ontario, which only the Tories could win.

Operation Downfall, the invasion of Japan, was scheduled for late 1945-early 1946. Bracken had promised conscription for the invasion of Japan whereas King had promised to commit one division of volunteers to the planned invasion of Japan. Based on the way that the Japanese had fought the battles of Iwo Jima and Okinawa it was widely expected that the invasion of the Japanese home islands would be a bloody campaign, and Bracken's promise of conscription for the planned invasion of Japan did much to turn voters against his party.

Co-operative Commonwealth Federation

Campaigning under the slogan, "Work, Security, and Freedom for All – with the CCF", the CCF promised to retain war-time taxes on high incomes and excess profits in order to fund social services, and to abolish the Senate of Canada. The CCF fought hard to prevent the support of labour from going to the Labor-Progressive Party (i.e., the Communist Party of Canada).

The LPP, for its part, pointed out that the CCF's refusal to enter into an electoral pact with the LPP had cost the CCF 100,000 votes in the Ontario election, and had given victory to the Ontario PCs. It urged voters to "Make Labour a Partner in Government."

Social Credit

The Social Credit Party of Canada tried, with modest success, to capitalize on the positive image of the Alberta Socred government of William Aberhart, asking voters, "Good Government in Alberta -- Why Not at Ottawa?". Referring to social credit monetary theories, the party encouraged voters to "Vote for the National Dividend".

National results

Notes:

* The party did not nominate candidates in the previous election.

x - less than 0.005% of the popular vote.

1 1945 Progressive Conservative vote compared to 1940 National Government + Conservative vote.

2 1945 Social Credit vote compared to 1940 New Democracy + Social Credit vote.

3 1945 Labor-Progressive vote compared to 1940 Communist vote.

4 The successful "Independent CCF" candidate ran as a People's Co-operative Commonwealth Federation candidate.

5 One Progressive Conservative candidate ran under the "National Government" label that the party had used in the 1940 election.

Vote and seat summaries

Results by province

xx - less than 0.05% of the popular vote.

Further reading

See also
 
List of Canadian federal general elections
List of political parties in Canada
20th Canadian Parliament

References

 
1945
 Federal
June 1945 events in Canada